Wilson Shannon Kennon (May 15, 1826 – June 18, 1895) was a Republican politician who was in the Ohio House of Representatives and was appointed Ohio Secretary of State from 1862 to 1863.

Wilson S. Kennon was son of William Kennon, Jr., who represented Ohio in the U.S. House of Representatives and sat on the Ohio Supreme Court. He was born in St. Clairsville, Ohio, where he continued to reside. He was educated at the "St. Clairsville Institute" and at Bethany College at Bethany, Virginia (now West Virginia). He studied law in his father's office, and was admitted to the bar in 1850.

In 1861, Wilson Kennon was elected to represent Belmont County, Ohio in the Ohio House of Representatives for the 55th General Assembly, convening January 6, 1862. Before the American Civil War, Kennon was a Democrat, but was nominated to the legislature by the Unconditional Union Party of Belmont County. In May 1862, fellow Belmont Countian Benjamin Rush Cowen resigned as Secretary of State after a few months in office to go to war. Kennon was appointed to the office by Governor David Tod. Election of Secretary of State was then moved to even numbered years, and Kennon was nominated by the Republican Party on the second ballot for the 1862 election. In the General Election of 1862, Kennon lost to Democrat  William W. Armstrong in an election where out of state soldiers were not allowed to vote.

After his term in office expired, Kennon became a Paymaster in the United States Army, and served throughout the American Civil War. He attained the rank of Major.

After the war, Kennon engaged in private practice of law at Cincinnati, in partnership with Milton Sayler and John W. Okey, for five years. He then moved back to Belmont County after his father's paralysis. He served as Belmont County Prosecuting Attorney for six years. Kennon died at his St. Clairsville home on June 18, 1895. At the time he was mayor of St. Clairsville.

Notes

References

Secretaries of State of Ohio
Members of the Ohio House of Representatives
People from St. Clairsville, Ohio
Ohio Republicans
Ohio lawyers
People of Ohio in the American Civil War
County district attorneys in Ohio
Bethany College (West Virginia) alumni
Politicians from Cincinnati
Mayors of places in Ohio
1826 births
1895 deaths
Ohio Democrats
Ohio Unconditional Unionists
Kennon family (Ohio)
19th-century American lawyers